The Volkswagen Tayron is a compact crossover SUV produced by FAW-Volkswagen.

Overview 

The Tayron was presented as a near production concept named VW Advanced Midsize SUV during the premiere of the Volkswagen Touareg III in March 2018. At the Chengdu Motor Show in September 2018, Volkswagen finally presented the production vehicle. Since October 2018, it is available in China.

The Tayron is built by FAW-Volkswagen. 1.4-litre and 2.0-litre turbocharged engines are standard, paired to a 7-speed dual clutch gearbox. 280TSI, 330TSI and 380TSI trims are available. Other models include the Tayron R-Line and Tayron GTE Plug-In Hybrid.

Tayron X 
A variant with a coupé CUV body style called the "Tayron X" was announced in April 2020. It resembles the Volkswagen SUV Coupé Concept that was shown at the 2019 edition of Auto Shanghai.

Powertrain

Sales

References

External links

Tayron
Cars introduced in 2018
Crossover sport utility vehicles
All-wheel-drive vehicles
Front-wheel-drive vehicles
2010s cars
Cars of China
Compact sport utility vehicles